Franca Raimondi (8 July 1932 – 22 April 1990) was an Italian singer.

Biography
Born in Monopoli, Province of Bari, Apulia, Raimondi studied operatic singing and foreign languages. In 1956, Raimondi was among the winners of a RAI contest of new voices and got the chance to perform at the 1956 edition of the Sanremo Music Festival, which she eventually won with the song "Aprite le finestre". That same year she represented Italy in the first Eurovision Song Contest with the same song, alongside Tonina Torrielli with "Amami se vuoi".

Between 1956 and 1958 Raimondi was leading vocalist in the Gian Stellari Orchestra. In 1960 she entered the competition at the Festival di Napoli with "Canzone all'antica" ("Old-style song"). In the later years she slowed her activities, focusing her career on live performances.

See also 
 Eurovision Song Contest 1956
 Italy in the Eurovision Song Contest

References

External links 

1932 births
People from Monopoli
Eurovision Song Contest entrants for Italy
Eurovision Song Contest entrants of 1956
Sanremo Music Festival winners
20th-century Italian women singers
Living people